Joseph Francis "Joe" Shonakan (13 November 1913 - 24 November 1973) was an English professional footballer who played as a outside right. He made appearances in the English Football League for Rochdale, Wrexham and Southport

References

1913 births
1973 deaths
English footballers
Association football wingers
Bolton Wanderers F.C. players
Ashton National F.C. players
Northampton Town F.C. players
Rochdale A.F.C. players
Wrexham A.F.C. players
Southport F.C. players
Chorley F.C. players
Northwich Victoria F.C. players
English Football League players